The 1995 New Zealand Royal Visit Honours were appointments by Elizabeth II to the Royal Victorian Order, to mark her visit to New Zealand that year. They were announced via a Special Honours List on 10 November 1995.

The recipients of honours are displayed here as they were styled before their new honour.

Royal Victorian Order

Dame Grand Cross (GCVO)
 Her Excellency Dame Catherine Anne Tizard  – Governor-General of New Zealand.

Commander (CVO)
 Genevieve Margaret Jordan  – New Zealand secretary to The Queen.
 Neville Hugo Sale Judd – official secretary, Government House.
 Janet Marie Warren Shroff – clerk of the Executive Council, secretary of the Cabinet and acting clerk of the Privy Council.
 Colonel Joseph James Walker  – comptroller, Government House.

Lieutenant (LVO)
 Paul Newton Brewer – deputy director, Royal Visit. 
 Phillippe Patrick O'Shea – New Zealand Herald of Arms Extraordinary to The Queen.

Member (MVO)
 Michael John Dinnan – motor transport officer, Royal Visit. 
 Squadron Leader Russell Graeme Pirihi – Royal New Zealand Air Force; New Zealand equerry to The Queen.

Royal Victorian Medal

Gold (RVM)
 Robert Hotson Francis Sisson-Stretch  – butler, Government House.

References

1995 awards
Royal Visit Honours
Monarchy in New Zealand